Tropical Fantasy is an inexpensive soft-drink, originally from Brooklyn, New York. Its low price of 49¢ per 21-ounce bottle led to its success in the 1990s. Tropical Fantasy was initially popular in inner city areas. The company did not employ large marketing campaigns and used simple store displays and low prices to sell its drinks. This made the product almost invisible to consumers not living in areas where the beverages were sold.
Tropical Fantasy is bottled by a small family-owned soft-drink manufacturer called Brooklyn Bottling Group, which has bottled seltzers since 1936. In 1990, with its debut of the Tropical Fantasy line, the soft-drinks became an overnight success. It now bottles over $2 million each month in sales.

Juice Cocktails
 Apple Juice
 Blue Raspberry
 Citrus Delight
 Fruit Punch
 Grape
 Kiwi Strawberry
 Lemon Iced Tea
 Mandarin Orange
 Passion Fruit
 Piña Colada
 Raspberry Rush
 Strawberry Lemonade
 Lemonade
 Cherry blue lemonade

Soft Drinks
 Black Cherry
 Champagne Kola
 Coconut
 Cola
 Cotton Candy
 Flite
 Ginger Ale
 Golden Fruit Champagne
 Grape Drink
 Island Punch Finisher
 Kool Kombucha Kooler
 Lemon 'n Lime
 Mango
 Mountain Rush
 Orange
 Pineapple
 Watermelon
 Wild Blue Cherry
 Wild Pink Strawberry
 Sweet Tea

African-American conspiracy theory
In April 1991, rumors began circulating in Black neighborhoods that the beverage was laced with a secret ingredient that would sterilize black men. The beverage quickly earned the nickname "Tropical Fanticide."  The rumors claimed that the Ku Klux Klan was actually bottling the product and using the low price to attract poor citizens. Similar unfounded rumors about Klan involvement periodically have plagued the Church's Fried Chicken chain and Snapple soft drinks.

Later that year the rumor spread rapidly and provoked violence in many city neighborhoods. Attacks occurred on delivery trucks and storekeepers who stocked Tropical Fantasy. Due to these rumors and rising suspicions, sales of the beverage plummeted by 70%.

Investigations found the claims to be as preposterous. Sales recovered only after an extensive public relations campaign that included then-New York City Mayor David N. Dinkins, (who was Black) drinking a bottle of the soda for television news cameras.

By mid June 1991 the attacks had stopped and the sales had rebounded, but the dark rumors about Tropical Fantasy were not forgotten. Even today, the rumors are still circulating. Many young teenagers refer to the beverages as "Bummies" and "Nutties", mainly due to the rumor that it kills sperm. This is not however limited to the Tropical Fantasy beverage. Other beverages such as "City Club", "Top Pop", and "C&C", are ridiculed in exactly the same way.

References

External links
 Tropical Fantasy website
 Brooklyn Bottling Group
 Snopes

American soft drinks
Cuisine of New York City
Culture of Brooklyn
Conspiracy theories involving race and ethnicity
Products introduced in 1990